Scott Marshall may refer to:
Scott Marshall (director) (born 1969), American film director
Scott Marshall (footballer) (born 1973), Scottish former professional footballer and coach
Scott Marshall, character in Up, Up and Away

See also
Marshall Scott, baseball pitcher